Adriana Turea (born 20 April 1975) is a Romanian luger. She competed in the women's singles event at the 1994 Winter Olympics.

References

1975 births
Living people
Romanian female lugers
Olympic lugers of Romania
Lugers at the 1994 Winter Olympics
People from Sinaia